The Egiin Gol is a river in the Khövsgöl and Bulgan aimags in northern Mongolia. It is the only outflow of Lake Khövsgöl and a left tributary of the Selenge river. Wooden bridges exist near Khatgal and in Tünel sum, and a concrete bridge has been built in Erdenebulgan. In Bulgan aimag there is a bridge between Teshig and Khutag-Öndör sums.

Since the early 1990s there have been efforts to build a hydroelectric dam on this river. These attempts, however, have been opposed by several academic communities: archaeology because of the rich and not yet fully explored archaeological sites in area; geology because the area may have earthquakes.  A dam would also displace parts of the local population as it floods some pastures and homesteads.

See also
List of rivers of Mongolia

References

Rivers of Mongolia
Khövsgöl Province